State Highway 148 (SH 148)  is a north–south state highway that runs from US 281 in Jacksboro  through Henrietta to SH 79 in Petrolia.

Route description
SH 148 is a two-lane improved surface highway that connects the various farming and economic centers of Jack and Clay Counties. Almost all of the route is rural and traffic is rarely a concern anywhere along the route.

History
SH 148 was originally designated on March 19, 1930 along a route from the Red River northwest of Petrolia via Henrietta to Antelope as a renumbering of SH 25A. On October 26, 1932, the section south of Henrietta was cancelled. The route was extended to Jacksboro on November 18, 1938. On August 1, 1941, the section of SH 148 north of Charlie was cancelled and obliterated, as the bridge was destroyed due to flooding. The section north of Petrolia was transferred to FM 810 on August 24, 1948. In 1974, Highway 148 became nationally significant due to its appearance in the movie The Texas Chain Saw Massacre.

Major intersections

References

148
Transportation in Clay County, Texas
Transportation in Jack County, Texas